Carlos Eduardo Keosseián Lagomarsino (born 18 March 1988) is a Uruguayan–born Armenian footballer that currently plays for Atenas in the Uruguayan Primera División.

Career

Club
On 9 January 2018, Atenas announced that Keosseián had signed a new contract with the club.

References

External links
 
 
 

1988 births
Living people
Footballers from Montevideo
Uruguayan footballers
Uruguayan people of Armenian descent
Ethnic Armenian sportspeople
Uruguayan expatriate footballers
Racing Club de Montevideo players
Club Atlético Temperley footballers
Atenas de San Carlos players
Magallanes footballers
Primera B de Chile players
Expatriate footballers in Chile
Expatriate footballers in Argentina
Association football midfielders